Robert Warwick (born Robert Taylor Bien, October 9, 1878 – June 6, 1964) was an American stage, film and television actor with over 200 film appearances. A matinee idol during the silent film era, he also prospered after the introduction of sound to cinema. As a young man he had studied opera singing in Paris and had a rich, resonant voice. At the age of 50, he developed as a highly regarded, aristocratic character actor and made numerous "talkies".

Early life
Warwick was born Robert Taylor Bien in 1878 to Louis and Isabel (Taylor) Bien. 

Some sources say he was born in England; others say Sacramento, California. His father was of French ethnicity. Bien studied music in Paris and trained for two years to be an opera singer, but acting proved to be his greater calling. He met his future wife, Arline Peck in Paris; the American couple married in 1902. After his return to the United States, he started in theatre and then film.

Stage 
Warwick (by then using his stage name) made his Broadway debut in 1903 in the play Glad of It. One of his co-stars was a young John Barrymore, also making his Broadway debut. Both actors, over time, became matinee idols. For the next twenty years Warwick appeared in such plays as Anna Karenina (1906), Two Women (1910), with Mrs. Leslie Carter; and The Kiss Waltz (1911) and Miss Prince (1912), in both of which he was able to display his singing voice. 

He also appeared in The Secret (1913), A Celebrated Case (1915) and Drifting (1922) with Alice Brady, not to mention several other plays through the end of the 1920s.

Military service 
Warwick served in the United States Army during World War I as an infantry captain and as a liaison officer with the French Army.

Film career

Warwick started making silent films in 1914, with his early work including The Mad Lover (1917) and Thou Art the Man (1920). He made numerous productions in the 1910s primarily in Fort Lee, New Jersey. Two films, Alias Jimmy Valentine and A Girl's Folly, both directed by Maurice Tourneur, have been preserved, and showcase Warwick as a silent actor, as well as Tourneur's directing talent. Both  are available in the 21st century on home video. 

From the 1920s on, Warwick alternated doing plays and silent films. He was fifty when sound films arrived, and though middle aged and with his matinee idol looks fading, he found plenty of work in character roles, much enhanced by his rich, resonant voice, eloquent diction, and aristocratic manner. When the studios moved to Los Angeles, Warwick followed. Throughout the 1930s and 1940s, Warwick's dependable acting and superb voice ensured that he was seldom out of work. 

Warwick's extensive filmography includes such classics as The Little Colonel (1935) with Shirley Temple and The Adventures of Robin Hood (1938) with Errol Flynn. He was one of a number of actors favored by director Preston Sturges and appeared in many of his films, among them Sullivan's Travels (1941), The Palm Beach Story (1942) and Hail the Conquering Hero (1944). He also appeared in I Married a Witch (1942) and Man from Frisco (1944).

Television and later life
Warwick made numerous appearances on television almost from its initial popularity in the late 1940s. In his seventies he was still hard at work and made appearances on every type of television show, from Westerns such as Broken Arrow and Sugarfoot, to the adventure series Rescue 8, to the science fiction series The Twilight Zone, to the anthology series The Loretta Young Show.

Personal life
Warwick married Arline Peck in 1903; they had a daughter, Rosalind. They divorced in 1909.  

By 1910, Warwick married actress Josephine Whittell (1883-1961), but the childless marriage also ended in divorce. 

In 1930 he married Stella Larrimore (1905–60) (a sister of Francine Larrimore). They had a daughter, Betsey, who later became a poet in Los Angeles.  

Warwick died June 6, 1964, in West Los Angeles, California, at age 85. Survivors included his daughters and two grandchildren.

Complete filmography

Silent

The Dollar Mark (1914) as James "Jim" Gresham
The Man of the Hour (1914, extant) as Henry Garrison
Across the Pacific (1914, extant) as Minor Role (unconfirmed and uncredited)
Alias Jimmy Valentine (1915, extant) as Jimmy Valentine
The Man Who Found Himself (1915) as James Clarke
An Indian Diamond (1915 short)
The Face in the Moonlight (1915) as Victor / Rabat
The Stolen Voice (1915, extant, Library of Congress) as Gerald D'Orville
The Flash of an Emerald (1915) as Lucius Waldeck
The Sins of Society (1915) as Captain Dorian March
Fruits of Desire (1916) as Mark Truitt
The Supreme Sacrifice (1916) as David Aldrich
Human Driftwood (1916, lost) as Robert Hendricks
Sudden Riches (1916) as Robert Crewe
Friday the 13th (1916) as Robert Brownley
The Heart of a Hero (1916, extant) as Nathan Hale
All Man (1916) as Jim Blake
The Man Who Forgot (1917, lost) as The Man, later known as John Smith
A Girl's Folly (1917, extant) as Kenneth Driscoll
The Argyle Case (1917, lost) as Asche Kayton
Hell Hath No Fury (1917)
The Family Honor (1917) as Captain Stephen Wayne
 The False Friend (1917) as William Ramsdell
The Silent Master (1917) as Valentin, aka Monsieur Simon
 The Mad Lover (1917) as Robert Hyde
The Accidental Honeymoon (1918, incomplete, fragment in the Library of Congress) as Robert Courtland
Secret Service (1919, lost) as Major Lewis K. Dumont
Told in the Hills (1919, extant, Gosfilmofond) as Jack Stuart
In Mizzoura (1919, lost) as Jim Radburn
An Adventure in Hearts (1919, lost) as Captain Dieppe
The Tree of Knowledge (1920, lost) as Nigel Stanyon
Jack Straw (1920, extant) as Jack Straw
Thou Art the Man (1920, lost) as Myles Calthrope
The City of Masks (1920, lost) as Tommy Trotter
The Fourteenth Man (1920, lost) as Captain Douglas Gordon
The Spitfire (1924, lost) as Oliver Blair

Sound

 Unmasked (1929) as Craig Kennedy
The Royal Bed (1931) as Premier Northrup - Prime Minister
Not Exactly Gentlemen (1931) as Layne Hunter
A Holy Terror (1931) as John Bard aka Thomas Woodbury
The Woman from Monte Carlo (1932) as Morbraz
So Big! (1932) as Simeon Peake, Gambler
The Rich Are Always with Us (1932) as The Doctor
The Dark Horse (1932) as Mr. Clark
Unashamed (1932) as Mr. Ogden
Doctor X (1932) as Police Commissioner Stevens
The Girl from Calgary (1932) as Bill Webster
I Am a Fugitive from a Chain Gang (1932) as Fuller
Afraid to Talk (1932) as Jake Stranskey
Silver Dollar (1932) as Colonel Stanton
The Secrets of Wu Sin (1932) as Roger King
Frisco Jenny (1932) as Kelly (uncredited)
Ladies They Talk About (1933) as Warden (uncredited)
Racetrack (1933) as Minor Role (uncredited)
The Three Musketeers (1933, Serial) as Col. Brent [Ch. 1]
The Whispering Shadow (1933 serial) as Detective Robert Raymond
Fighting with Kit Carson (1933) as Chief Dark Eagle (uncredited)
Pilgrimage (1933) as Maj. Albertson
The Power and the Glory (1933) as Edward - Chairman of Board Meeting (uncredited)
Charlie Chan's Greatest Case (1933) as Dan Winterslip
Female (1933) as Attorney Bradley (uncredited)
Jimmy the Gent (1934) as Probate Judge Kalsmeyer (uncredited)
School for Girls (1934) as Governor
No Sleep on the Deep (1934 short) as Emerson Eldridge
Midnight Alibi (1934) as Assistant District Attorney (uncredited)
The Dragon Murder Case (1934) as Dr. Halliday
Cleopatra (1934) as General Achillas
A Shot in the Dark (1935) as Joseph Harris
The Little Colonel (1935) as Colonel Gray
Night Life of the Gods (1935) as Neptune
Code of the Mounted (1935) as Inspector Malloy
The Murder Man (1935) as Colville
Hop-Along Cassidy (1935) as Jim Meeker
The Farmer Takes a Wife (1935) as Junius Brutus Booth (uncredited)
Anna Karenina (1935) as Colonel at Banquet (uncredited)
Two Sinners (1935) as Minor Role (uncredited)
Bars of Hate (1935) as The Governor
Timber War (1935) as Ferguson
The Fighting Marines (1935, Serial) as Col. W. R. Bennett
A Thrill for Thelma (1935, Short) as Captain Richard Kyne (uncredited)
Whipsaw (1935) as Robert W. Wadsworth
A Tale of Two Cities (1935) as Judge at Tribunal
Tough Guy (1936) as Mr. Frederick Martindale Vincent II
The Return of Jimmy Valentine (1936) as Jimmy Davis
Sutter's Gold (1936) as Gen. Alexander Rotscheff
The Bride Walks Out (1936) as Mr. McKenzie
Mary of Scotland (1936) as Sir Francis Knollys
Charlie Chan at the Race Track (1936) as Police Chief (uncredited)
Romeo and Juliet (1936) as Lord Montague
The Vigilantes Are Coming (1936, Serial) as Count Ivan Raspinoff
Bulldog Edition (1936) as Evans
In His Steps (1936) as Judge Grey
Adventure in Manhattan (1936) as Phillip
Can This Be Dixie? (1936) as Winston
White Legion (1936) as Capt. Parker
Can This Be Dixie? (1936) as Gen. Beauregard Peachtree
The Bold Caballero (1936) as Governor Palma
Give Me Liberty (1936, Short) as George Washington
High Hat (1937) as Craig Dupont Sr.
Woman in Distress (1937) as Van Alsten (uncredited)
Let Them Live (1937) as The Mayor
The Prince and the Pauper (1937) as Lord Warwick
The Road Back (1937) as Judge
Souls at Sea (1937) as Vice Admiral (uncredited)
The Life of Emile Zola (1937) as Major Henry
Jungle Menace (1937 serial) as Chief Insp. Angus MacLeod
Fit for a King (1937) as Prime Minister
Counsel for Crime (1937) as Asa Stewart
The Trigger Trio (1937) as John Evans
The Awful Truth (1937) as Mr. Vance
Conquest (1937) as Capt. Laroux (uncredited)
The Spy Ring (1938) as Col. Burdette
The Adventures of Robin Hood (1938) as Sir Geoffrey
 Law of the Plains (1938) as Willard McGowan
Blockade (1938) as Vallejo
Squadron of Honor (1938) as Kimball
Come On, Leathernecks! (1938) as Colonal Butler
Army Girl (1938) as Brig. Gen. Matthews
Gangster's Boy (1938) as Tim Kelly
Annabel Takes a Tour (1938) as Race Track Announcer (uncredited)
Going Places (1938) as Frome
Fighting Thoroughbreds (1939) as Commissioner (uncredited)
Devil's Island (1939) as Demonpre
Almost a Gentleman (1939) as Major Mabrey
Juarez (1939) as Maj. Du Pont (uncredited)
The Magnificent Fraud (1939) as General Pablo Hernandez
In Old Monterey (1939) as Major Forbes
Konga, the Wild Stallion (1939) as Jordan Hadley
The Ash Can Fleet (1939, Short) as Von Hindenberg (uncredited)
The Private Lives of Elizabeth and Essex (1939) as Lord Mountjoy
La Inmaculada (1939)
Four Wives (1939) as Mr. Roberts (scenes deleted)
The Earl of Chicago (1940) as Clerk at Parliament (uncredited)
Teddy, the Rough Rider (1940, Short) as Capt. Leonard Wood (uncredited)
Murder in the Air (1940) as Doctor Finchley
On the Spot (1940) as Cyrus Haddon
New Moon (1940) as Commissar
The Sea Hawk (1940) as Frobisher
The Great McGinty (1940) as Opposition Speaker (uncredited)
A Dispatch from Reuter's (1940) as Opposition Parliament Speaker (uncredited)
Christmas in July (1940) as Juror (uncredited)
The Lady Eve (1941) as Passenger on Ship (uncredited)
A Woman's Face (1941) as Associate Judge
This England (1941) (uncredited)
I Was a Prisoner on Devil's Island (1941) as Governor
Sullivan's Travels (1941) as Mr. LeBrand
Louisiana Purchase (1941) as Speaker of the House
Cadets on Parade (1942) as Colonel Metcalfe
The Fleet's In (1942) as Admiral Wright
Eagle Squadron (1942) as Bullock
Secret Enemies (1942) as Otto Zimmer, aka Dr. Woodford
The Palm Beach Story (1942) as Mr. Hinch
I Married a Witch (1942) as J.B. Masterson
Tennessee Johnson (1942) as Major Crooks
Two Tickets to London (1943) as Ormsby
Dixie (1943) as Mr. LaPlant
Women at War (1943 short) as Maj. Gen. "Blood and Thunder" Travis
Deerslayer (1943) as Chief Uncas
In Old Oklahoma (1943) as Chief Big Tree (uncredited)
Man from Frisco (1944) as Bruce McRae
Hail the Conquering Hero (1944) as Marine Colonel (uncredited)
Kismet (1944) as Alfife
Bowery to Broadway (1944) as Cliff Brown
The Princess and the Pirate (1944) as The King
Sudan (1945) as Maatet
Criminal Court (1946) as Mr. Marquette
The Falcon's Adventure (1946) as Kenneth Sutton
Unconquered (1947) as Pontiac, Chief of the Ottawas (scenes cut)
Gentleman's Agreement (1947) as Irving Weisman (uncredited)
Pirates of Monterey (1947) as Governor de Sola
Fury at Furnace Creek (1948) as Gen. Fletcher Blackwell
The Three Musketeers (1948) as D'Artagnan Sr. (uncredited)
Million Dollar Weekend (1948) as Dave Dietrich
Adventures of Don Juan (1948) as Don José - Count de Polan
Gun Smugglers (1948) as Colonel Davis
A Woman's Secret (1949) as Roberts
Impact (1949) as Capt. Callahan
Francis (1950) as Col. Carmichael
In a Lonely Place (1950) as Charlie Waterman
Tarzan and the Slave Girl (1950) as High Priest
Vendetta (1950) as The French Prefect
Sugarfoot (1951) as J.C. Crane
The Sword of Monte Cristo (1951) as Marquis de Montableau
The Mark of the Renegade (1951) as Colonel Vega
The Star (1952) as R.J., Aging Actor at Party
Against All Flags (1952) as Capt. Kidd
The Mississippi Gambler (1953) as Gov. Paul Monet
Salome (1953) as Courier (uncredited)
Jamaica Run (1953) as Court Judge
Raiders of the Seven Seas (1953) as New Governor of Cuba (uncredited)
Fort Algiers (1953) as Haroon
The Story of Father Juniper Serra (1954, TV Movie) as Father Serra
Silver Lode (1954) as Judge Cranston
Passion (1954) as Padre (uncredited)
Escape to Burma (1955) as The Sawbwa
Chief Crazy Horse (1955) as Spotted Tail
The Hammer and the Sword (1955, TV Movie) as George Washington
Lady Godiva of Coventry (1955) as Humbert
While the City Sleeps (1956) as Amos Kyne
Walk the Proud Land (1956) as Chief Eskiminzin
Shoot-Out at Medicine Bend (1957) as Brother Abraham
The Buccaneer (1958) as Capt. Lockyer
Night of the Quarter Moon (1959) as Judge
It Started with a Kiss (1959) as Congressman Muir
Song Without End (1960) as Emissary (scenes cut)

References

External links

 
 
 
 
 Robert Warwick photos at NYP Library
 old post card of Robert Warwick
 Paramount lobby card for Thou Art The Man (1920) starring Robert Warwick
 Robert Warwick(Aveleyman)

1878 births
1964 deaths
20th-century American male actors
American male silent film actors
American male stage actors
American male television actors
United States Army personnel of World War I
Burials at Holy Cross Cemetery, Culver City
Male actors from Los Angeles
Male actors from Sacramento, California
United States Army officers